Anita Váczi (born 9 February 1986) is a Hungarian paracanoeist who competes in international level events. Her highest achievement is reaching the final at the paracanoe at the 2016 Summer Paralympics - Women's KL1 where she finished sixth.

References

1986 births
Living people
Sportspeople from Debrecen
People from Borsod-Abaúj-Zemplén County
Paracanoeists of Hungary
Hungarian female canoeists
Paracanoeists at the 2016 Summer Paralympics